The Epiphone Jack Casady Signature Bass is a 4-string hollowbody bass guitar manufactured by Epiphone. Jack Casady approached Gibson (parent company of Epiphone) with the basic design, inspired by Casady's experience with the 1970s-era Gibson Les Paul Signature bass.

It is an all mahogany, semi hollow bass guitar with a single low-impedance humbucking pickup. The pickup was designed to correct what Casady perceived as a weakness of the original Les Paul Signature bass, which was a lack of tonal definition in ensemble playing situations.  The pickup is connected to a transformer with a three-position switch to select output impedance of 50, 250 or 500 ohms. The lower impedance values give clearer, more balanced tone while the higher impedances produce higher output with a more bass-heavy tonal profile.

References

Epiphone electric bass guitars